Pyrgotoides crassipes is a species of tephritid or fruit flies in the genus Pyrgotoides of the family Tephritidae.

Distribution
Panama.

References

Tephritinae
Insects described in 1934
Diptera of North America